Acis tingitana is a species of flowering plant in the family Amaryllidaceae, native to north Morocco. Rare in cultivation, it is not fully frost-hardy.

Description
Acis tingitana is a bulbous flowering plant. Forms described under the synonym Leucojum fontianum have four to five leaves per bulb, each 6–8 mm wide, produced with the flowers in spring. The flowering stems are about 10–12 cm tall, and bear up to four flowers, with six 1–1.5 cm-long tepals, each with a sharply pointed tip. Forms described under the synonym Leucojum tingitanum are less robust, with narrower leaves.

Taxonomy
Acis tingitana was first described in 1878 by John Gilbert Baker, as Leucojum tingitanum. The specific epithet tingitanus refers to Tangier, in Morocco. In 1934, René Maire described Leucojum fontianum. Although in 1987 Brian Mathew regarded the two species as distinct, in 1992, he synonymized them. In 2004, Leucojum tingitanum was transferred to the genus Acis, along with other species of Leucojum, on the basis of a molecular phylogenetic study.

Distribution and habitat
Acis tingitana is native to north Morocco, particularly around Tangier. It occurs below about 1500 m. One collection came from wet ground around a stream.

Cultivation
Rare in cultivation, Acis tingitana is not fully frost-hardy, and requires protection.

References

tingitana
Flora of Morocco
Plants described in 1878
Taxa named by John Gilbert Baker